Arlene may refer to:

 Arleen, a feminine name, also spelled Arlene
 "Arlene" (song), the 1985 debut single by American country music artist Marty Stuart
 Arlene, a Beanie Baby cat produced by Ty, Inc.
 Hurricane Arlene, the name of several tropical storms in the Atlantic Ocean
 Arlene, a cat character in the Garfield cartoon series.